Yakupovo (Yaqup) is a rural locality (a selo) in Kilimovsky Selsoviet, Buzdyaksky District, Bashkortostan, Russia. The population was 312 as of 2010. There are 2 streets.

Geography 
Yakupovo is located 30 km north of Buzdyak (the district's administrative centre) by road. Shigaykulbash is the nearest rural locality.

References 

Rural localities in Buzdyaksky District